Plastic Dreams is an album by American jazz group the Modern Jazz Quartet, augmented by a brass section on three tracks, recorded in 1971 and released on the Atlantic label.

Reception
At the time of its original release the Gramophone reviewer stated "Plastic Dreams is an auspicious release for it lacks much of the pretentiousness which I have learned to dread ever since I first saw the Quartet in Paris in 1956".

The Allmusic review stated "Plastic Dreams has never been a critic's favorite, and was an album that mystified many of the group's longtime followers... Plastic Dreams was as close as the MJQ ever got to making a pop album... Indeed, as a whole Plastic Dreams does seem like a final refinement of several idealistic threads found throughout the MJQ's studio work stretching back to about 1960, with generous room made for new directions".

Track listing
All compositions by John Lewis except as indicated
 "Walkin' Stomp" - 4:45   
 "Dancing" (Milt Jackson) - 5:14   
 "Plastic Dreams" - 5:22   
 "Variations on a Christmas Theme" (Traditional, arranged Lewis) - 4:25   
 "Trav'lin'" - 4:41   
 "Piazza Navona" - 6:36   
 "England's Carol" (Traditional, arranged Lewis) - 5:20

Personnel
Milt Jackson - vibraphone
John Lewis - piano, harpsichord
Percy Heath - bass
Connie Kay - drums 
Joe Newman, Snooky Young - trumpet (tracks 4-6)
Garnett Brown - trombone (tracks 4-6)
Jimmy Buffington - French horn (tracks 4-6)
Don Butterfield - tuba (tracks 4-6)

References

Atlantic Records albums
Modern Jazz Quartet albums
1971 albums
Albums produced by Arif Mardin